The Notre Dame Fighting Irish softball team represents the University of Notre Dame in the sport of softball.  The Irish compete in Division I of the National Collegiate Athletics Association (NCAA) and the Atlantic Coast Conference (ACC).  The Irish play their home games at Melissa Cook Stadium on the university's Notre Dame, Indiana campus, and are currently led by head coach Deanna Gumpf.

Season by Season Results

References